Hangzhou Spark is a Chinese professional Overwatch esports team based in Hangzhou, Zhejiang. The Spark compete in the Overwatch League (OWL) as a member of the league's East region. Founded in 2018, Hangzhou Spark began play as one of eight expansion teams in 2019 and is one of four professional Overwatch teams based in China. The team is owned by Bilibili, a Chinese video sharing website; the company also owns Bilibili Gaming, who operate their own Overwatch division that compete in Overwatch Contenders as an academy team for the Spark.

Franchise history

OWL expansion 
On 7 September 2018, Activision Blizzard announced that Chinese video sharing website Bilibili had purchased an expansion team based in Hangzhou for Overwatch League's second season. On 14 November, the team revealed their team name as Hangzhou Spark.

On 16 November, the Spark revealed their new head coach, Lee "Mask" Mu-ho. In the following week, the Spark revealed their 10-man inaugural roster through a series of Twitter posts, consisting of players from different Chinese and Korean Contenders teams.

Early years: 2019–present 
Hangzhou's first regular season OWL match was a 3–1 victory over the Shanghai Dragons on 14 February 2019, in the 2019 season. The Spark qualified for the both the Stage 2 and Stage 3 playoffs, but failed to reach the finals in either one. Hangzhou struggled at the beginning of Stage 4, which was the beginning of the enforced 2-2-2 role lock by the league, after suspending their starting damage player Cai "Krystal" Shilong — an event that later led to the Spark's parent company Bilibili taking legal actions. The team lost their first three matches of the stage but recovered by winning their final four matches, ending the regular season with an 18–10 record and the fourth seed in the season playoffs. The Spark began their playoff run with a 3–4 loss to the Los Angeles Gladiators, sending them to the lower bracket. The team defeated the Seoul Dynasty, 4–1, in the first round of the lower bracket, followed by a 4–0 sweep over the Atlanta Reign in the second round. The Spark's season came to an end after a 0–4 loss to the San Francisco Shock.

Prior to the 2020 season, the Spark made minor changes to their roster, departing with two players and promoting two from their academy team Bilibili Gaming. In the first two regional midseason tournaments of the 2020 season, the May Melee and Summer Showdown, Hangzhou lost 0–3 in the quarterfinals each time. Following, Hangzhou released head coach Lee "Mask" Mu-ho and promoted assistant coach Huang "Pajion" Ji-sub to head coach. In the third, and final, midseason tournament, the Countdown Cup, the Spark reached the finals, but lost to the Shanghai Dragons. The team finished the regular season with a 12–10 record. Hangzhou fell in the Asian play-in tournament to the Seoul Dynasty, 0–3, ending their season.

Looking to improve from their 2020 season, the Spark nearly instantly maxed out their roster with rookies in the 2021 offseason. After an 0–2 start to the 2021 season, the Spark released head coach Hwang "paJion" Ji-sub and promoted Hwang "Andante" Jae-hong to interim head coach. In the first week of June, the Spark hosted the first live OWL events of the 2021 season, marking the first time that live OWL events took place in China. Head coach Hwang "Andante" Jae-hong was released on 15 July 2021, due to "irreconcilable differences between Andante’s and the rest of Spark’s ideals," leaving assistant coach assistant coach Chen "U4" Congshan as the only member on the coaching staff. The Spark finished the regular season in fifth place in the Eastern region. Prior to the start of the postseason, starting Spark support player Lee "MCD" Jeong-ho was dropped from the team following reports that he had made xenophobic remarks towards a Chinese player. Their season ended after they were eliminated in the play-in tournament tournament semifinals, losing to the Philadelphia Fusion.

Team identity 
On 14 November 2018, Bilibili officially announced the brand of their franchise, the Hangzhou Spark. The name "Spark" symbolizes the immense speed and power electricity, as well as the "electric nature and creative spark" of the Bilibili brand.

The logo is in the team's official colors of pink, white, and blue. It depicts a hand-gesture in shape of a gun with electricity emerging from it and is a reference to Mikoto Misaka from A Certain Scientific Railgun. The official colors are vibrant in nature to reflect the fast-growing nature of Hangzhou.

Personnel

Current roster

Head coaches

Awards and records

Seasons overview

Individual accomplishments 
Role Star selections
guxue (Qiulin Xu) – 2019
iDK (Park Ho-jin) – 2019

All-Star Game selections
guxue (Qiulin Xu) – 2019

Academy team

On 15 March 2019, the Hangzhou Spark announced their official academy team, Bilibili Gaming (BLG), and full roster. The team competes in Contenders China.

References

External links 

 

 
Esports teams based in China
Overwatch League teams
Esports teams established in 2018
2018 establishments in China